The 2014 Toronto Blue Jays season was the 38th season for the franchise, and the 25th full season of play (26th overall) at Rogers Centre. Pitcher Roy Halladay signed a one-day contract with the Blue Jays before retiring from baseball, citing injuries.

The Blue Jays announced their 2014 schedule on September 10, 2013.

Standings

American League East

American League Wild Card

Records vs opponents

2014 Draft
The 2014 Major League Baseball draft was held on June 5–7.

 – Toronto received the 11th overall pick in the 2014 draft as compensation for not signing Phillip Bickford in 2013.

Regular season

Summary
The Blue Jays started the year, like most years in the past 10, in mediocre fashion, ending the month of April with a record of 12 wins and 15 losses, 3  games behind the Eastern division leaders. The month of May was a different story; they won 21 games and lost 9, taking over sole possession of the division lead on May 22. The month was memorable for a 9-game winning streak which included series sweeps over the Boston Red Sox (away), the Oakland A's (at home) and the Tampa Bay Rays (at home). Edwin Encarnación hit 16 home runs during the month, tying an American League record for homers in May, set by Mickey Mantle in 1956. Between May 15 and June 6, the Blue Jays won 18 out of 21 to climb into their largest division lead, at any point of the season, since 1993.  However, from June 7 to June 30 the Jays won only 7 more games versus 15 losses.  As of June 30, they were just 6 games above .500, but still held onto a 1  game lead in their division.

The Blue Jays had three All Stars in 2014: José Bautista, Mark Buehrle, and Edwin Encarnación.

On July 26, the Blue Jays ended a streak of 17 consecutive losses in games against the Yankees at Yankee Stadium. On August 10, the Blue Jays played the longest game in franchise history in terms of both time and innings, defeating the Detroit Tigers 6–5 after 19 innings. After a poor August, Toronto opened September with its first series win in Tampa Bay since April 6–8, 2007. They would go on to complete the sweep, their first at Tropicana Field. Top prospect Daniel Norris made his MLB debut on September 5, striking out David Ortiz in his  of an inning.

On September 23, the Blue Jays were officially eliminated from playoff contention. The Kansas City Royals clinched a playoff spot on September 26, making the Blue Jays the owners of the longest active MLB playoff drought, until clinching a playoff berth the following year.

|-  style="text-align:center; background:#fbb;"
| 1 || March 31 || @ Rays || 2–9 || Price (1–0) || Dickey (0–1) || || 31,042 || 0–1 || 1
|-

|-  style="text-align:center; background:#bfb;"
| 2 || April 1 || @ Rays || 4–2 || Hutchison (1–0) || Cobb (0–1) || Santos (1) || 11,113 || 1–1 || ½
|-  style="text-align:center; background:#bfb;"
| 3 || April 2 || @ Rays || 3–0 || Buehrle (1–0) || Moore (0–1) || Cecil (1) || 10,808 || 2–1 || +½
|-  style="text-align:center; background:#fbb;"
| 4 || April 3 || @ Rays || 2–7 || Archer (1–0) || Morrow (0–1) ||  || 9,571 || 2–2 || ½
|-  style="text-align:center; background:#fbb;"
| 5 || April 4 || Yankees || 3–7 || Tanaka (1–0) || McGowan (0–1) || || 48,197 || 2–3 || 1
|-  style="text-align:center; background:#bfb;"
| 6 || April 5 || Yankees || 4–0 || Dickey (1–1) || Pineda (0–1) || Santos (2) || 45,446 || 3–3 || 1
|-  style="text-align:center; background:#fbb;"
| 7 || April 6 || Yankees || 4–6 || Sabathia (1–1) || Hutchison (1–1) || Robertson (2) || 34,067 || 3–4 || 1
|-  style="text-align:center; background:#bfb;"
| 8 || April 8 || Astros || 5–2 || Buehrle (2–0) || Oberholtzer (0–2) || Santos (3) || 13,123 || 4–4 || ½
|-  style="text-align:center; background:#bfb;"
| 9 || April 9 || Astros || 7–3 || Morrow (1–1) || Harrell (0–2) ||  || 13,569 || 5–4 || +½
|-  style="text-align:center; background:#fbb;"
| 10 || April 10 || Astros || 4–6 || Keuchel (1–1) || Dickey (1–2) || Bass (1) || 15,778 || 5–5 || –
|-  style="text-align:center; background:#bfb;"
| 11 || April 11 || @ Orioles || 2–0 || McGowan (1–1) || Tillman (1–1) || Santos (4) || 22,327 || 6–5 || –
|-  style="text-align:center; background:#fbb;"
| 12 || April 12 || @ Orioles || 1–2 (12) || Britton (2–0) || Redmond (0–1) || || 30,446 || 6–6 || 1
|-  style="text-align:center; background:#bfb;"
| 13 || April 13 || @ Orioles || 11–3 || Buehrle (3–0) || Jiménez (0–3) || || 39,281 || 7–6 || –
|-  style="text-align:center; background:#bfb;"
| 14 || April 15 || @ Twins || 9–3 || Loup (1–0) || Hughes (0–1) || || 21,818 || 8–6 || +½
|-  style="text-align:center; background:#ccc;"
| – || April 16 || @ Twins ||colspan="7" | Postponed (snow). Makeup date: April 17.
|-  style="text-align:center; background:#fbb;"
| 15 || April 17 || @ Twins || 0–7 || Gibson (3–0) || Dickey (1–3) || || 20,507 || 8–7 || 1½
|-  style="text-align:center; background:#fbb;"
| 16 || April 17 || @ Twins || 5–9 || Fien (3–0) || Santos (0–1) || || 20,698 || 8–8 || 2
|-  style="text-align:center; background:#bfb;"
| 17 || April 18 || @ Indians || 3–2 || Delabar (1–0) || Rzepczynski (0–1) || Santos (5) || 16,335 || 9–8 || 1
|-  style="text-align:center; background:#bfb;"
| 18 || April 19 || @ Indians || 5–0 || Buehrle (4–0) || Kluber (1–2) || || 15,188 || 10–8 || –
|-  style="text-align:center; background:#fbb;"
| 19 || April 20 || @ Indians || 4–6 || Outman (3–0) || Loup (1–1) || Axford (6) || 11,716 || 10–9 || 1
|-  style="text-align:center; background:#bfb;"
| 20 || April 22 || Orioles || 9–3 || Delabar (2–0) || Meek (0–1) || || 14,866 || 11–9 || 1
|-  style="text-align:center; background:#fbb;"
| 21 || April 23 || Orioles || 8–10 || Tillman (3–1) || Redmond (0–2) || Hunter (6) || 15,202 || 11–10 || 1
|-  style="text-align:center; background:#fbb;"
| 22 || April 24 || Orioles || 4–11 || Norris (1–2) || Cecil (0–1) || || 16,283 || 11–11 || 2
|-  style="text-align:center; background:#fbb;"
| 23 || April 25 || Red Sox || 1–8 || Peavy (1–0) || Buehrle (4–1) || || 29,411 || 11–12 || 2
|-  style="text-align:center; background:#fbb;"
| 24 || April 26 || Red Sox || 6–7 || Buchholz (1–2) || Morrow (1–2) || Uehara (5) || 40,322 || 11–13 || 3
|-  style="text-align:center; background:#bfb;"
| 25 || April 27 || Red Sox || 7–1 || Dickey (2–3) || Lester (2–4) || || 45,260 || 12–13 || 3
|-  style="text-align:center; background:#fbb;"
| 26 || April 29 || @ Royals || 7–10 || Crow (1–1) || Cecil (0–2) ||  || 10,705 || 12–14 || 3
|-  style="text-align:center; background:#fbb;"
| 27 || April 30 || @ Royals || 2–4 || Herrera (1–1) || Hutchison (1–2) || Holland (7) || 11,715 || 12–15 || 3½
|-

|-  style="text-align:center; background:#bfb;"
| 28 || May 1 || @ Royals || 7–3 || Buehrle (5–1) || Guthrie (2–2) || Loup (1) || 11,207 || 13–15 || 2½
|-  style="text-align:center; background:#fbb;"
| 29 || May 2 || @ Pirates || 5–6 || Melancon (1–1) || Santos (0–2) || || 24,547 || 13–16 || 3
|-  style="text-align:center; background:#fbb;"
| 30 || May 3 || @ Pirates || 6–8 || Morris (3–0) || Redmond (0–3) || Melancon (1) || 31,439 || 13–17 || 3½
|-  style="text-align:center; background:#bfb;"
| 31 || May 4 || @ Pirates || 7–2 || McGowan (2–1) || Vólquez (1–3) || || 29,496 || 14–17 || 2½
|-  style="text-align:center; background:#bfb;"
| 32 || May 5 || @ Phillies || 3–0 || Happ (1–0) || Kendrick (0–3) || Cecil (2) || 25,275 || 15–17 || 1½
|-  style="text-align:center; background:#bfb;"
| 33 || May 6 || @ Phillies || 6–5 (10) || Stroman (1–0) || Bastardo (3–2) || Loup (2) || 26,057 || 16–17 || 1½
|-  style="text-align:center; background:#bfb;"
| 34 || May 7 || Phillies || 10–0 || Buehrle (6–1) || Lee (3–3) || || 16,446 || 17–17 || 1½
|-  style="text-align:center; background:#bfb;"
| 35 || May 8 || Phillies || 12–6 || Dickey (3–3) || Burnett (2–2) || || 18,158 || 18–17 || 1½
|-  style="text-align:center; background:#fbb;"
| 36 || May 9 || Angels || 3–4 || Smith (2–0) || Cecil (0–3) || Frieri (4) || 21,383 || 18–18 || 2½
|-  style="text-align:center; background:#fbb;"
| 37 || May 10 || Angels || 3–5 || Skaggs (3–1) || Happ (1–1) || Smith (4) || 31,412 || 18–19 || 3½
|-  style="text-align:center; background:#fbb;"
| 38 || May 11 || Angels || 3–9 || Weaver (4–2) || Hutchison (1–3) || || 20,871 || 18–20 || 3½
|-  style="text-align:center; background:#bfb;"
| 39 || May 12 || Angels || 7–3 || Buehrle (7–1) || Wilson (4–3) || || 13,603 || 19–20 || 2½
|-  style="text-align:center; background:#bfb;"
| 40 || May 13 || Indians || 5–4 || Dickey (4–3) || Masterson (2–2) || Janssen (1) || 13,673 || 20–20 || 1½
|-  style="text-align:center; background:#fbb;"
| 41 || May 14 || Indians || 4–15 || Kluber (4–3) || McGowan (2–2) || || 14,068 || 20–21 || 1½
|-  style="text-align:center; background:#bfb;"
| 42 || May 15 || Indians || 4–2 || Happ (2–1) || Salazar (1–4) || Janssen (2) || 17,364 || 21–21 || 1½
|-  style="text-align:center; background:#bfb;"
| 43 || May 16 || @ Rangers || 2–0 || Hutchison (2–3) || Darvish (3–2) || || 39,129 || 22–21 || 1½
|-  style="text-align:center; background:#bfb;"
| 44 || May 17 || @ Rangers || 4–2 || Delabar (3–0) || Cotts (1–3) || Janssen (3) || 39,723 || 23–21 || ½
|-  style="text-align:center; background:#fbb;"
| 45 || May 18 || @ Rangers || 2–6 || Poreda (2–0) || Dickey (4–4) || || 43,671 || 23–22 || 1
|-  style="text-align:center; background:#bfb;"
| 46 || May 20 || @ Red Sox || 7–4 || Happ (3–1) || Doubront (2–4) || Janssen (4) || 37,904 || 24–22 || ½
|-  style="text-align:center; background:#bfb;"
| 47 || May 21 || @ Red Sox || 6–4 || Hutchison (3–3) || Buchholz (2–4) || Janssen (5) || 36,116 || 25–22 || –
|-  style="text-align:center; background:#bfb;"
| 48 || May 22 || @ Red Sox || 7–2 || Buehrle (8–1) || Lester (4–6) || || 36,018 || 26–22 || +1
|-  style="text-align:center; background:#bfb;"
| 49 || May 23 || Athletics || 3–2 || Hendriks (1–0) || Kazmir (5–2) || Janssen (6) || 21,007 || 27–22 || +1½
|-  style="text-align:center; background:#bfb;"
| 50 || May 24 || Athletics || 5–2 || Dickey (5–4) || Chavez (4–2) || Cecil (3) || 29,372 || 28–22 || +2
|-  style="text-align:center; background:#bfb;"
| 51 || May 25 || Athletics || 3–1 || Happ (4–1) || Pomeranz (4–2) || Janssen (7) || 45,277 || 29–22 || +2
|-  style="text-align:center; background:#bfb;"
| 52 || May 26 || Rays || 10–5 || Hutchison (4–3) || Bédard (2–3) || || 15,616 || 30–22 || +2
|-  style="text-align:center; background:#bfb;"
| 53 || May 27 || Rays || 9–6 || Buehrle (9–1) || Cobb (1–2) || Janssen (8) || 15,993 || 31–22 || +3
|-  style="text-align:center; background:#bfb;"
| 54 || May 28 || Rays || 3–2 || Loup (2–1) || Oviedo (1–1) || || 17,309 || 32–22 || +3
|-  style="text-align:center; background:#fbb;"
| 55 || May 29 || Royals || 6–8 (10) || Davis (4–1) || Redmond (0–4) || Holland (15) || 17,978 || 32–23 || +2½
|-  style="text-align:center; background:#fbb;"
| 56 || May 30 || Royals || 1–6 || Vargas (5–2) || Happ (4–2) || || 21,543 || 32–24 || +2½
|-  style="text-align:center; background:#bfb;"
| 57 || May 31 || Royals || 12–2 || Stroman (2–0) || Brooks (0–1) || Redmond (1) || 31,652 || 33–24 || +2½
|-

|-  style="text-align:center; background:#bfb;"
| 58 || June 1 || Royals || 4–0 || Buehrle (10–1) || Guthrie (2–5) || || 38,008 || 34–24 || +3½
|-  style="text-align:center; background:#bfb;"
| 59 || June 3 || @ Tigers || 5–3 || McGowan (3–2) || Nathan (2–2) || Janssen (9) || 33,488 || 35–24 || +4½
|-  style="text-align:center; background:#bfb;"
| 60 || June 4 || @ Tigers || 8–2 || Dickey (6–4) || Porcello (8–3) || || 32,033 || 36–24 || +4½
|-  style="text-align:center; background:#bfb;"
| 61 || June 5 || @ Tigers || 7–3 || Happ (5–2) || Verlander (6–5) || Janssen (10) || 39,440 || 37–24 || +5½
|-  style="text-align:center; background:#bfb;"
| 62 || June 6 || Cardinals || 3–1 || Stroman (3–0) || Lynn (6–4) || Janssen (11) || 33,528 || 38–24 || +6
|-  style="text-align:center; background:#fbb;"
| 63 || June 7 || Cardinals || 0–5 || Miller (7–5) || Buehrle (10–2) || || 42,981 || 38–25 || +5½
|-  style="text-align:center; background:#fbb;"
| 64 || June 8 || Cardinals || 0–5 || García (2–0) || Hutchison (4–4) || || 45,726 || 38–26 || +5½
|-  style="text-align:center; background:#bfb;"
| 65 || June 9 || Twins || 5–4 || Janssen (1–0) || Guerrier (0–1) || || 19,428 || 39–26 || +5½
|-  style="text-align:center; background:#fbb;"
| 66 || June 10 || Twins || 0–4 || Correia (3–7) || Happ (5–3) || || 20,681 || 39–27 || +5½
|-  style="text-align:center; background:#fbb;"
| 67 || June 11 || Twins || 2–7 || Hughes (7–2) || Stroman (3–1) || || 45,080 || 39–28 || +4½
|-  style="text-align:center; background:#fbb;"
| 68 || June 12 || @ Orioles || 2–4 || Gausman (2–1) || Buehrle (10–3) || Britton (6) || 17,403 || 39–29 || +3½
|-  style="text-align:center; background:#bfb;"
| 69 || June 13 || @ Orioles || 4–0 || Hutchison (5–4) || Jiménez (2–8) || McGowan (1) || 44,031 || 40–29 || +3½
|-  style="text-align:center; background:#fbb;"
| 70 || June 14 || @ Orioles || 2–3 || Norris (6–5) || Dickey (6–5) || Britton (7) || 33,901 || 40–30 || +3½
|-  style="text-align:center; background:#bfb;"
| 71 || June 15 || @ Orioles || 5–2 || Happ (6–3) || Tillman (5–4) || Janssen (12) || 46,469  || 41–30 || +4½
|-  style="text-align:center; background:#fbb;"
| 72 || June 17 || @ Yankees || 1–3 || Tanaka (11–1) || Stroman (3–2) || Robertson (17) || 41,834 || 41–31 || +3½
|-  style="text-align:center; background:#fbb;"
| 73 || June 18 || @ Yankees || 3–7 || Whitley (3–0) || Buehrle (10–4) || || 41,342 || 41–32 || +2½
|-  style="text-align:center; background:#fbb;"
| 74 || June 19 || @ Yankees || 4–6 || Phelps (3–4) || Hutchison (5–5) || Warren (2) || 40,169 || 41–33 || +1½
|-  style="text-align:center; background:#bfb;"
| 75 || June 20 || @ Reds || 14–9 || McGowan (4–2) || Chapman (0–2) || || 33,103 || 42–33 || +1½
|-  style="text-align:center; background:#fbb;"
| 76 || June 21 || @ Reds || 1–11 || Leake (5–6) || Happ (6–4) || || 42,530 || 42–34 || +1½
|-  style="text-align:center; background:#fbb;"
| 77 || June 22 || @ Reds || 3–4 || Cueto (7–5) || Dickey (6–6) || Chapman (13) || 36,089 || 42–35 || +1½
|-  style="text-align:center; background:#bfb;"
| 78 || June 23 || Yankees || 8–3 || Stroman (4–2) || Whitley (3–1) || || 31,554 || 43–35 || +1½
|-  style="text-align:center; background:#bfb;"
| 79 || June 24 || Yankees || 7–6 || Janssen (2–0) || Warren (1–4) || || 34,206 || 44–35 || +2½
|-  style="text-align:center; background:#fbb;"
| 80 || June 25 || Yankees || 3–5 || Kuroda (5–5) || Hutchison (5–6) || Robertson (18) || 34,710 || 44–36 || +1½
|-  style="text-align:center; background:#bfb;"
| 81 || June 26 || White Sox || 7–0 || Happ (7–4) || Carroll (2–4) || || 23,248 || 45–36 || +2
|-  style="text-align:center; background:#fbb;"
| 82 || June 27 || White Sox || 4–5 || Danks (7–6) || Dickey (6–7) || Petricka (2) || 24,173 || 45–37 || +1½
|-  style="text-align:center; background:#fbb;"
| 83 || June 28 || White Sox || 3–4 || Sale (7–1) || McGowan (4–3) || Putnam (1) || 39,623 || 45–38 || +1½
|-  style="text-align:center; background:#fbb;"
| 84 || June 29 || White Sox || 0–4 || Quintana (5–7) || Buehrle (10–5) || || 33,177 || 45–39 || +1½
|-

|-  style="text-align:center; background:#bfb;"
| 85 || July 1 || Brewers || 4–1 || Hutchison (6–6) || Estrada (7–5) || Janssen (13) || 45,088 || 46–39 || +1
|-  style="text-align:center; background:#bfb;"
| 86 || July 2 || Brewers || 7–4 || Janssen (3–0) || Smith (1–1) || || 24,286 || 47–39 || +1
|-  style="text-align:center; background:#fbb;"
| 87 || July 3 || @ Athletics || 1–4 || Gray (8–3) || Dickey (6–8) || Doolittle (12) || 32,913 || 47–40 || – 
|-  style="text-align:center; background:#fbb;"
| 88 || July 4 || @ Athletics || 0–1 (12) || Otero (7–1) || Jenkins (0–1) || || 22,322 || 47–41 || ½
|-  style="text-align:center; background:#fbb;"
| 89 || July 5 || @ Athletics || 1–5 || Kazmir (10–3) || Buehrle (10–6) || || 20,236 || 47–42 || 1
|-  style="text-align:center; background:#fbb;"
| 90 || July 6 || @ Athletics || 2–4 || Samardzija (3–7) || Hutchison (6–7) || Doolittle (13) || 22,897 || 47–43 || 2
|-  style="text-align:center; background:#fbb;"
| 91 || July 7 || @ Angels || 2–5 || Shoemaker (7–2) || Happ (7–5) || Smith (11) || 38,189 || 47–44 || 3 
|-  style="text-align:center; background:#bfb;"
| 92 || July 8 || @ Angels || 4–0 || Dickey (7–8) || Skaggs (4–5) || || 38,111 || 48–44 || 2½
|-  style="text-align:center; background:#fbb;"
| 93 || July 9 || @ Angels || 7–8 || Grilli (1–3) || Loup (2–2) || Smith (12) || 35,726 || 48–45 || 2½
|-  style="text-align:center; background:#bfb;"
| 94 || July 11 || @ Rays || 8–5 || Loup (3–2) || Balfour (0–3) || Janssen (14) || 17,533 || 49–45 || 3 
|-  style="text-align:center; background:#fbb;"
| 95 || July 12 || @ Rays || 3–10 || Odorizzi (5–8) || Hutchison (6–8) || || 22,693 || 49–46 || 3 
|-  style="text-align:center; background:#fbb;"
| 96 || July 13 || @ Rays || 0–3 || Price (9–7)  || Dickey (7–9) || McGee (7) || 17,187 || 49–47 || 4 
|-  style="text-align:center; background:#fbb;"
| 97 || July 18 || Rangers || 1–5 || Darvish (9–5) || Dickey (7–10) || || 38,012 || 49–48 || 4 
|-  style="text-align:center; background:#bfb;"
| 98 || July 19 || Rangers || 4–1 || Stroman (5–2) || Lewis (6–7) || Loup (3) || 45,802 || 50–48 || 4
|-  style="text-align:center; background:#bfb;"
| 99 || July 20 || Rangers || 9–6 || Redmond (1–4) || Feliz (0–1) || Loup (4) || 36,011 || 51–48 || 3
|-  style="text-align:center; background:#fbb;"
| 100 || July 21 || Red Sox || 1–14 || Lackey (11–6) || Hutchison (6–9) || || 27,905 || 51–49 || 4 
|-  style="text-align:center; background:#bfb;"
| 101 || July 22 || Red Sox || 7–3 || Happ (8–5) || Peavy (1–9) || Cecil (4) || 29,269 || 52–49 || 4
|-  style="text-align:center; background:#bfb;"
| 102 || July 23 || Red Sox || 6–4 || Dickey (8–10) || Buchholz (5–6) || Janssen (15) || 35,696 || 53–49 || 3
|-  style="text-align:center; background:#bfb;"
| 103 || July 24 || Red Sox || 8–0 || Stroman (6–2) || De La Rosa (3–3) || || 46,683 || 54–49 || 3
|-  style="text-align:center; background:#fbb;"
| 104 || July 25 || @ Yankees || 4–6 || Kuroda (7–6) || Buehrle (10–7) || Robertson (26) || 44,237 || 54–50 || 4
|-  style="text-align:center; background:#bfb;"
| 105 || July 26 || @ Yankees || 6–4 || Hutchison (7–9) || Kelley (1–3) || || 46,166 || 55–50 || 3 
|-  style="text-align:center; background:#bfb;"
| 106 || July 27 || @ Yankees || 5–4 || Sanchez (1–0) || Robertson (1–3) || Janssen (16) || 45,063 || 56–50 || 3
|-  style="text-align:center; background:#bfb;"
| 107 || July 28 || @ Red Sox || 14–1 || Dickey (9–10) || Buchholz (5–7) || || 37,974 || 57–50 || 2½
|-  style="text-align:center; background:#bfb;"
| 108 || July 29 || @ Red Sox || 4–2 || Stroman (7–2) || De La Rosa (3–4) || Janssen (17) || 38,275 || 58–50 || 2½
|-  style="text-align:center; background:#bfb;"
| 109 || July 30 || @ Red Sox || 6–1 || Buehrle (11–7) || Workman (1–4) || || 38,203 || 59–50 || 2½ 
|-  style="text-align:center; background:#bfb;"
| 110 || July 31 || @ Astros || 6–5 || Sanchez (2–0) || Qualls (1–3) || Janssen (18) || 17,423 || 60–50 || 1½ 
|-

|-  style="text-align:center; background:#fbb;"
| 111 || August 1 || @ Astros || 1–3 || Veras (1–1) || Loup (3–3) || Qualls (12) || 19,576 || 60–51 || 2½
|-  style="text-align:center; background:#fbb;"
| 112 || August 2 || @ Astros || 2–8 || Oberholtzer (4–7) || Dickey (9–11) || || 19,946 || 60–52 ||  2½
|-  style="text-align:center; background:#fbb;"
| 113 || August 3 || @ Astros || 1–6 || Feldman (5–8) || Stroman (7–3) || || 19,932 || 60–53 || 3½
|-  style="text-align:center; background:#fbb;"
| 114 || August 5 || Orioles || 3–9 || Norris (9–7) || Buehrle (11–8) || || 36,183 || 60–54 || 5
|-  style="text-align:center; background:#bfb;"
| 115 || August 6 || Orioles || 5–1 || Hutchison (8–9) || Chen (12–4) || || 33,054 || 61–54 || 4
|-  style="text-align:center; background:#fbb;"
| 116 || August 7 || Orioles || 1–2 || González (6–6) || Happ (8–6) || Britton (24) || 34,676 || 61–55 || 5 
|-  style="text-align:center; background:#fbb;"
| 117 || August 8 || Tigers || 4–5 || Alburquerque (3–1) || Janssen (3–1) || Nathan (24) || 36,237 || 61–56 || 6 
|-  style="text-align:center; background:#bfb;"
| 118 || August 9 || Tigers || 3–2 (10) || Loup (4–3) || Chamberlain (1–5) || || 45,927 || 62–56 || 6
|-  style="text-align:center; background:#bfb;"
| 119 || August 10 || Tigers || 6–5 (19) || Jenkins (1–1) || Porcello (13–7) || || 46,126 || 63–56 || 5 
|-  style="text-align:center; background:#fbb;"
| 120 || August 11 || @ Mariners || 1–11 || Hernández (13–3) || Hutchison (8–10) || || 41,168 || 63–57 || 6 
|-  style="text-align:center; background:#fbb;"
| 121 || August 12 || @ Mariners || 3–6 || Young (11–6) || Happ (8–7) || Rodney (34) || 26,076 || 63–58 || 6½
|-  style="text-align:center; background:#fbb;"
| 122 || August 13 || @ Mariners || 0–2 || Iwakuma (11–6) || Dickey (9–12) || Rodney (35) || 32,368 || 63–59 || 7½
|-  style="text-align:center; background:#fbb;" 
| 123 || August 15 || @ White Sox || 5–11 || Noesí (7–8) || Stroman (7–4) || || 22,739 || 63–60 || 7½ 
|-  style="text-align:center; background:#bfb;"
| 124 || August 16 || @ White Sox || 6–3 || Cecil (1–3) || Lindstrom (2–2) || Janssen (19) || 29,420 || 64–60 || 6½ 
|-  style="text-align:center; background:#fbb;"
| 125 || August 17 || @ White Sox || 5–7 || Caroll (5–7) || Hutchison (8–11) || Petricka (9) || 25,761 || 64–61 || 7½ 
|-  style="text-align:center; background:#fbb;"
| 126 || August 19 || @ Brewers || 1–6 || Fiers (3–1) || Happ (8–8) || || 42,221 || 64–62 || 9
|-  style="text-align:center; background:#bfb;"
| 127 || August 20 || @ Brewers || 9–5 || Dickey (10–12) || Nelson (2–4) || || 39,300 || 65–62 || 9
|-  style="text-align:center; background:#fbb;"
| 128 || August 22 || Rays || 0–8 || Smyly (8–10) || Stroman (7–5) || || 28,506 || 65–63 || 9
|-  style="text-align:center; background:#bfb;"
| 129 || August 23 || Rays || 5–4 (10) || McGowan (5–3) || Peralta (2–4) || || 37,451 || 66–63 || 8
|-  style="text-align:center; background:#fbb;"
| 130 || August 24 || Rays || 1–2 (10)|| McGee (4–1) || Santos  (0–3) || Boxberger (2) || 38,869 || 66–64 || 8
|-  style="text-align:center; background:#fbb;"
| 131 || August 25 || Red Sox || 3–4 (10) || Uehara (6–4) || Sanchez (2–1) || Breslow (1) || 26,041 || 66-65 || 9
|-  style="text-align:center; background:#fbb;"
| 132 || August 26 || Red Sox || 7–11 (11) || Tazawa (3–3) || Janssen (3–2) || || 27,321 || 66–66 || 10 
|-  style="text-align:center; background:#bfb;"
| 133 || August 27 || Red Sox || 5–2 || Stroman (8–5) || Layne (1–1) || Cecil (5) || 30,285 || 67–66 || 9
|-  style="text-align:center; background:#fbb;"
| 134 || August 29 || Yankees || 3–6 || Capuano (2–3) || Buehrle (11–9) || Robertson (35) || 43,318 || 67–67 || 10½
|-  style="text-align:center; background:#bfb;"
| 135 || August 30 || Yankees || 2–0 || Hutchison (9–11) || Pineda (3–3) || Sanchez (1) || 45,863 || 68–67 || 10½
|-  style="text-align:center; background:#bfb;"
| 136 || August 31 || Yankees || 4–3 || Happ (9–8) || McCarthy (8–14) || Janssen (20) || 45,678 || 69–67 || 10½
|-

|-  style="text-align:center; background:#bfb;"
| 137 || September 2 || @ Rays || 8–2 || Dickey (11–12) || Hellickson (1–3) || || 10,125 || 70–67 || 10
|-  style="text-align:center; background:#bfb;"
| 138 || September 3 || @ Rays || 7–4 || Stroman (9–5) || Archer (8–8) || Sanchez (2) || 10,264 || 71–67 || 10 
|-  style="text-align:center; background:#bfb;"
| 139 || September 4 || @ Rays || 1–0 (10) || Cecil (2–3) || Geltz (0–1) || Janssen (21) || 10,392 || 72–67 || 10
|-  style="text-align:center; background:#fbb;"
| 140 || September 5 || @ Red Sox || 8–9 (10) || Layne (2–1) || Janssen (3–3) || || 35,667 || 72–68 || 10 
|-  style="text-align:center; background:#fbb;"
| 141 || September 6 || @ Red Sox || 3–4 || Buchholz (7–8) || Happ (9–9) || Mujica (4) || 36,677 || 72–69 || 10 
|-  style="text-align:center; background:#bfb;"
| 142 || September 7 || @ Red Sox || 3–1 || Dickey (12–12) || De La Rosa (4–6) || Janssen (22) || 36,261 || 73–69 || 10
|-  style="text-align:center; background:#bfb;"
| 143 || September 8 || Cubs || 8–0 || Stroman (10–5) || Turner (5–9) || || 16,879 || 74–69 || 10
|-  style="text-align:center; background:#bfb;"
| 144 || September 9 || Cubs || 9–2 || Buehrle (12–9) || Ramirez (2–2) || || 17,903 || 75–69 || 10
|-  style="text-align:center; background:#bfb;"
| 145 || September 10 || Cubs || 11–1 || Hutchison (10–11) || Hendricks (6–2) || || 19,411 || 76–69 || 10
|-  style="text-align:center; background:#fbb;"
| 146 || September 12 || Rays || 0–1 || Karns (1–0) || Happ (9–10) || Balfour (12) || 19,909 || 76–70 || 11½
|-  style="text-align:center; background:#bfb;"
| 147 || September 13 || Rays || 6–3 || Dickey (13–12) || Boxberger (5–2) || Janssen (23) || 31,368 || 77–70 || 10½
|-  style="text-align:center; background:#fbb;"
| 148 || September 14 || Rays || 5–6 (10) || McGee (5–2) || Morrow (1–3) || Beliveau (1) || 28,633 || 77–71 || 11½
|-  style="text-align:center; background:#fbb;"
| 149 || September 15 || @ Orioles || 2–5 || Chen (16–4) || Stroman (10–6) || Britton (35) || 25,061 || 77–72 || 12½
|-  style="text-align:center; background:#fbb;"
| 150 || September 16 || @ Orioles || 2–8 || Jiménez (5–9) || Hutchison (10–12) || || 35,297 || 77–73 || 13½
|-  style="text-align:center; background:#fbb;"
| 151 || September 17 || @ Orioles || 1–6 || Norris (14–8) || Happ (9–11) || || 37,537 || 77–74 || 14½
|-  style="text-align:center; background:#fbb;"
| 152 || September 18 || @ Yankees || 2–3 || Robertson (3–5) || Sanchez (2–2) || || 34,279 || 77–75 || 15 
|-  style="text-align:center; background:#fbb;"
| 153 || September 19 || @ Yankees || 3–5 || Kuroda (11–9) || Buehrle (12–10) || Warren (3) || 40,059 || 77–76 || 15
|-  style="text-align:center; background:#bfb;"
| 154 || September 20 || @ Yankees || 6–3 || Stroman (11–6) || Capuano (2–4) || Janssen (24) || 47,292 || 78–76 || 15
|-  style="text-align:center; background:#fbb;"
| 155 || September 21 || @ Yankees || 2–5 || Tanaka (13–4) || Hutchison (10–13) || Robertson (38) || 48,144 || 78–77 || 15
|-  style="text-align:center; background:#bfb;"
| 156 || September 22 || Mariners || 14–4 || Happ (10–11) || Paxton (6–4) ||  || 15,548 || 79–77 || 14
|-  style="text-align:center; background:#bfb;"
| 157 || September 23 || Mariners || 10–2 || Dickey (14–12) || Hernández (14–6) || || 16,272 || 80–77 || 14
|-  style="text-align:center; background:#bfb;"
| 158 || September 24 || Mariners || 1–0 || Buehrle (13–10) || Walker (2–3) || Sanchez (3) || 16,836 || 81–77 || 14 
|-  style="text-align:center; background:#fbb;"
| 159 || September 25 || Mariners || 5–7 || Medina (5–3) || Loup (4–4) || Rodney (47) || 17,173 || 81–78 || 14 
|-  style="text-align:center; background:#bfb;"
| 160 || September 26 || Orioles || 4–2 || Hutchison (11–13) || Tillman (13–6) || Stroman (1) || 27,037 || 82–78 || 13 
|-  style="text-align:center; background:#bfb;"
| 161 || September 27 || Orioles || 4–2 || Happ (11–11) || Chen (16–6) || Janssen (24) || 37,996 || 83–78 || 12 
|-  style="text-align:center; background:#fbb;"
| 162 || September 28 || Orioles || 0–1 || González (10–9) || Dickey (14–13) || Britton (37) || 45,901 || 83–79 || 13 
|-

Roster

Farm system

References

External links
2014 Toronto Blue Jays at Baseball Reference
ESPN

Toronto Blue Jays seasons
Toronto Blue Jays
Toronto Blue Jays
Toronto Blue Jays season